The Central Committee of the South African Communist Party is the highest decision-making body of the South African Communist Party (SACP). It is elected for a five-year term at regular national congresses of the SACP. The 15th National Central Committee was elected in July 2022 and will expire in 2027.

Current membership

Leadership
General Secretary: Solly Afrika Mapaila
First Deputy General Secretary: Madala Masuku
Second Deputy General Secretary: David Masondo
National Chairperson: Blade Nzimande
Deputy National Chairperson: Thulas Nxesi
National Treasurer: Joyce Moloi-Moropa

Members

 Polly Boshielo
 Gregory Brown 
 Nomarashiya Caluza
 Yunus Carrim	
 Rob Davies 
 Molly Dhlamini	
 Sdumo Dlamini
 Mluleki Dlelanga
 Kholiswa Fihlani
 Reneva Fourie
 Pat Horn
 Matlalepula Lkoma
 Zingiswa Losi
 Celiwe Madlopha
 Dibolelo Mahlatsi	
 Fikile Majola	
 Mugwena Maluleke	
 Buti Manamela
 Gwede Mantashe
 Ben Martins
 Alex Mashilo
 Stan Mathabatha
 Chris Mathlako
 Barry Mitchel
 Phumzile Mnguni
 Mabuse Mpe
 Dipuo Mvelase	
 Andries Nel
 Tinyiko Ntini
 James Nxumalo
 Grace Pampiri 
 Tebogo Phadu
 Rudolph Phala
 Solly Phetoe
 Yershen Pillay
 Zola Sapheta
 Jenny Schreiner
 Fisani Shabangu
 Mike Shingange
 Jerry Thibedi
 Lechesa Tsenoli	
 Joyce Tsipa
 Bulelwa Tunyiswa
 Langa Zitha

Historical membership

14th National Congress Central Committee (2017–2022)

Leadership
General Secretary: Blade Nzimande
First Deputy General Secretary: Solly Afrika Mapaila
Second Deputy General Secretary: Chris Matlhako
National Chairperson: Senzeni Zokwana
Deputy National Chairperson: Thulas Nxesi
National Treasurer: Joyce Moloi-Moropa

Elected members

 Frans Baleni
 Sheila Barsel	
 Yunus Carrim	
 Jeremy Cronin	
 Rob Davies	
 Sidumo Dlamini	
 Lindelwa Dunjwa	
 Reneva Fourie	
 Fezeka Loliwe	(died 2018)
 Zingiswa Losi
 Celiwe Madlopha	
 Khaya Magaxa	
 Fikile Majola	
 Mandla Makupula (died 2018)	
 Mugwena Maluleke
 Buti Manamela	
 Gwede Mantashe
 Joyce Mashamba (died 2018)
 Phumulo Masualle
 Madala Masuku
 Stanley Mathabatha
 Dipuo Mvelase
 Godfrey Oliphant
 Grace Pampiri-Bothman
 Phel Parkies
 Gwebinkundla Qonde
 Jeff Radebe
 Jenny Schreiner
 Sechaba Charles Setsubi (died 2018)
 Nomvuzo Shabalala (died 2020)
 Jerry Thibedi
 Lechesa Tsenoli
 Bulelwa Tunyiswa	
 Adrian Williams

Co-opted members
In June 2019, the following individuals were co-opted onto the Central Committee:

 Polly Boshielo 
 Nomarashiya Caluza 
 Mluleki Dlelanga 
 Pat Horn 	
 Fihlane Koliswa 		
 Mzwandile Makwaiba 
 Alex Mohubetswane Mashilo 
 David Masondo 	
 Yershen Pillay 

Sydney Mufamadi, Essop Pahad, Charles Nqakula, and David Niddrie were also co-opted onto the committee as "veterans".

13th National Congress Central Committee (2012–2017)

Leadership
General Secretary: Blade Nzimande
First Deputy General Secretary: Jeremy Cronin
Second Deputy General Secretary: Solly Afrika Mapaila
National Chairperson: Senzeni Zokwana
Deputy National Chairperson: Thulas Nxesi
National Treasurer: Joyce Moloi-Moropa

Members

 Frans Baleni	
 Sechaba Charles Setsubi
 Sheila Barsel	
 Jenny Schreiner
 Yunus Carrim	
 Lechesa Tsenoli
 Rob Davies
 Fiona Tregenna
 Lindelwa Dunjwa	
 Mandla Makupula
 Loliwe Fezeka	
 Phel Parkies
 Gwede Mantashe	
 Sidumo Dlamini
 Phumulo Masualle	
 Jeff Radebe
 Chris Matlhoka	
 Grace Bothman
 Fikile Majola	
 Godfrey Oliphant
 Ben Martins	
 Jerry Thibedi
 Joyce Mashamba	
 Adrian Williams
 George Mashamba	
 Buti Manamela
 Madala Masuku	
 Bulelwa Tunyiswa
 Willies Mchunu	
 Judy Malqueeny
 Crosby Moni
 Celiwe Madlopha
 Dipuo Mvelase	
 Gwebinkundla Qonde
 Nomonde Rasmeni
 Reneva Fourie

12th National Congress Central Committee (2007–2012)

Leadership
National Chairperson: Gwede Mantashe
Deputy Chairperson: Ncumisa Kondlo (died during the term; Central Committee appointed Joyce Moloi to serve as Deputy National Chairperson)
General Secretary: Blade Nzimande
Deputy General Secretary: Jeremy Cronin
National Treasurer: Phumulo Masualle

Members
	 
 Frans Baleni
 Joyce Moloi
 Sheila Barsel	
 Crosby Moni
 Yunus Carrim	
 Chris Motlhako
 Rob Davies	
 Dipuo Mvelase
 Lindelwa Dunjwa	
 Zukiswa Ncitha
 Nozizwe Madlala-Routledge 
 Charles Nqakula
 Fikile Majola	
 Thobile Ntola
 Solly Afrika Mapaila	
 Godfrey Oliphant
 Ben Martins
 Gwebinkundla Qonde
 Joyce Mashamba	
 Nomonde Rasmeni
 George Mashamba	
 Jenny Schreiner
 David Masondo	
 Sechaba Charles Setsubi
 Madala Masuku	
 Jerry Thibedi
 Noluthando Mayende-Sibiya 	
 Lechesa Tsenoli
 Willies Mchunu	
 Senzeni Zokwana
The Central Committee co-opted three additional members – Eric Mtshali, Kay Moonsamy, and John Nkamideng – as "veterans".

References

External links
Current Central Committee – South African Communist Party

South African Communist Party